Uncle Don's is a progressive chain of restaurants & bar specializing in the development of affordable quality dining experiences throughout Malaysia with additional diversified businesses associated with the food & beverage and hospitality industry. Founded and driven by experts in the industry, the group was established on the 11th of September 2015 and now comprise 44 high performance restaurants with many more exciting projects concurrently under development.

It's brand slogan “Dine like a Don everyday” conveys the brand's spirit of affordable dining in the simplest of ways and is today recognized as a leading brand for generating huge amount of traffic volume. It is themed as a family styled restaurant suitable for bringing family and friends together

History
In 2015, Uncle Don's launched their first outlet in SS2, Petaling Jaya. Later, they launched their second outlet in Publika followed by Taman Tun Dr Ismail, Hartamas & Taipan. As of 2021, they expanded to 44 outlets in a span of 7 years.

In 2018, Uncle Don's launched a 18,000 Square feet Central Kitchen to maintain food quality across all outlets.

Services
It was reported that as of 2022, there are 44 Uncle Don's Restaurants in Peninsular Malaysia. According to Malay Mail, Uncle Don's has "opened three more outlets in KL, Ipoh and Seremban to provide affordable alcoholic beverages and local cuisines to the large number of the Indian and Chinese population of that area".

Uncle Don's is operated by Uncle Don's Holdings Sdn Bhd through two wholly owned subsidiaries. Uncle Don's Restaurants Sdn Bhd (UDRSB), operates and manages all the restaurants and Uncle Don's Manufacturing Sdn Bhd (UDMSB), manufactures and distributes all food and beverage products used by their restaurants.

Awards and recognition
The BrandLaureate SMEs BestBrands Award, 2018-2019
The BrandLaureate SMEs Brand of The Decade Award 2019-2020 
The BrandLaureate Brand Builder of the Decade Award 2019-2020 	
The BrandLaureate BestBrands e-Branding Award 2020 	
The BrandLaureate BestBrands Brand Leadership Award 2020 	
The BrandLaureate SMEs BestBrands Best Choice Award 2022
SME100 Award Fast Moving Companies 2020 	
SME100 Most Sustainable Brand Award 2020 	
Golden Bull Award 2020 	
Superbrands Award 2021	
Best Casual Restaurant & Bar Chain (Malaysia) by Lux Life Magazine for Food And Drink Awards 2019 	
Most Successful Food & Beverage Enterprise (South East Asia) by Lux Life Magazine for Food And Drink Awards 2019 	
Best Beer Bar 2018 by The Bar Awards KL 	
Best Neighbourhood Bar 2018 by Time Out KL Food & Drink Awards 	
2020 Certificate of Excellence by Sluurpy based on recommendations received 	
Best takeaway food in Subang Jaya by Restaurant Guru 2020

References

External links 

2015 establishments in Malaysia
Food and drink companies of Malaysia